A civilian police oversight agency, also known as citizen review board or civilian review board, is a body of civilians that is tasked with reviewing and improving police conduct.

These agencies are an implementation of citizen oversight. This form of police accountability often gives the broader non-police community a medium to voice concerns and provide criticism of law enforcement operations, and improve officer conduct.

History 
The first recorded forms of civilian oversight took the form of police commissions in the late 19th and early 20th centuries, by Progressive Era reformers. They were initially begun to decrease the influence of politicians on local police forces. This ultimately failed, as politicians infiltrated these commissions, though they had little expertise in the field of policing.

After the failed police commissions, civilian oversight was revolutionized, and had its beginnings in large cities such as Washington D.C., Philadelphia, and New York City. This started due to turmoil between African Americans and police in the early 1900s, and also failed, because these review boards were under-resourced, and performed not much beyond receiving and reviewing complaints about misconduct against police officers. Ultimately, the resistance faced by the police force, and the lack of resources caused these review boards to be disbanded and abolished.

In the 1960s, another wave of civilian oversight began. One of these agencies included the Public Review Commission, and the Office of Citizen Complaints. These boards were also created out of the turmoil between African Americans and the police, except this was during the Civil Rights Era, where these clashes arguably climaxed. What separated these civilian oversight boards from their ancestors was that this type of board utilized other agencies to investigate police misconduct. They also had more enhanced resources, more authority, and more durability.

Though the Civil Rights Era civilian oversight boards were not failures, there were advancements to these boards in the 1990s, up to the present day. The number of civilian oversight committees rapidly increased after the videotaped beating of Rodney King by the officers of the Los Angeles Police Department in 1991. Most of these agencies and committees were focused on reviewing reported police activities. However, this era created the first police auditors, such as the San Jose Police Auditor, and the Special Counsel for the Los Angeles County Board of Supervisors, in 1993. Many of these auditors and review boards even combined into one stronger entity during this period. There were reportedly less than 40 civilian oversight agencies in 1990, over 100 by 2001, and 144 as of 2016, according to the National Association for Civilian Oversight of Law Enforcement. To date, the Bad Apple Oversight Commission Database puts the total number of verified oversight commissions in the United States close to 200.

Forms 
Contemporary forms of Civilian Oversight Agencies are often varied due a large degree of variance between the backgrounds of such jurisdictions. Each Agency may vary due to specific social and cultural issues unique to that location. Despite this, there are typically three overarching forms of Civilian Oversight Agencies. They are: Investigation-Focused Models, Review-Focused Models, and Auditor/monitor-focused models.

Investigation-focused models 
Generally, this form of oversight agency is separate from the district's local police division. They operate by investigating reports of misconduct of police officers in their jurisdiction. The benefits of running an investigation-focused model agency is that they can complete thorough and impartial investigations into police conduct with a minimal degree of bias. It is common for those running these agencies to have a significant degree of training as to not improperly diagnose an investigation.

Further, these models heavily involve the citizens of the district they are representing. Thus, the operations of the investigation are transparent and this increases community trust in the operations of both the civilian oversight agency and the police department under which they reside. Another advantage to this model is the fact that it allows (more than others) for hiring of full-time staff to conduct the investigation - resulting in a more thorough analysis.

The negatives of this form are related to the significant costs of operation. This plays out largely in the costs of staffing full-time individuals to conduct investigations.

Review-focused models 
This category of oversight agencies are focused on reviewing the quality of internal investigations and especially those conducted by internal police-run oversight agencies. These are often entirely voluntary organization, unlike the Investigation-Focused models where there are often full-time investigators on the oversight agency. They are often focused on providing community input into the police investigation process to ensure that the community that the police have jurisdiction over has a voice.

The operations that a review-focused agency often implement are: to take in community complaints, review the police investigations of complaints from the community, make community recommendations to high level police directors, listen to community appeals, and to obtain and analyze community input.

The strengths of this model are that it may seem like these sorts of agencies are more transparent to the community that ones with full-time investigators. Further, it allows for community input into police-ran investigations, which can help in analyzing appropriate conduct for officers. Finally, they are also the least expensive option for oversight agencies since they are entirely volunteer run. Thus, they are more popular in areas with fewer funds to allocate.

The limitations of this sort of agency are that they tend to have a more limited authority over the conduct of police agencies. Further, they may be less independent from other oversight agencies since they rely heavily on the police department for information. Finally, due to a lack of funding, the members of these agencies are likely to have less training and ability to complete oversight into a police department effectively.

Auditor/monitor-focused models 
Finally, Auditor/Monitor-Focused models tend to be affecting systemic, large-scale reform to the police agencies within their jurisdiction. This is also one of the newest forms of citizen oversight and it tends to have a unique set of goals that distinguish it from other oversight agencies. These goals are: to monitor the internal complaint investigations process, to conduct evaluations of police training and codes of conduct, and to ensure effective public reporting.

One of the strengths of this sort of organization is that these agencies may have a broader access to critical information about police officer conduct and training. This allows for a deeper understanding of how to reform such an agency. Further, auditor and monitors of such agencies are likely to be experts in policing, allowing for a deeper fix than the other agencies. It is also likely that these agencies will conduct more change than superficial ones enacted by Investigation-Focused and Review-Focused Models. This would be because they are tackling the roots of what may cause poor police officer conduct and that it can also hold officers more accountable.

The limitations of such an agency would include a relative lack of community support for such an organization. This would stem from the fact that members of such a committee would be full-time, paid individuals and so may not "represent the community". Further, since a long-term systemic change is desired, compromises in individual cases may be made for the sake of systemic change. This may result in community backlash. Further, this form of citizen oversight can only make recommendations to law enforcement and cannot enforce changes onto them. Finally, the effectiveness of such an agency would depend heavily on the quality of individuals hired to do the task - more so than other oversight agencies. This is because ensuring a systemic change requires a high degree of technical sophistication and training to ensure effective outcomes.

List of places with civilian oversight

Problems with oversight

Issues civilian police review boards face 
 Hostility, resistance, and obstruction by rank-and-file police officers, police department leaders, and police unions.
 An inadequate framework by which to hold officers accountable.
 The ability of police departments to routinely ignore recommendations made by civilian review agencies.
 Inadequate access to resources (funding, access to case information, etc.)

45% of oversight agencies do not have enabling statues/ordinances that explicitly require that Law Enforcement Employees Cooperate with their agency. A further 69% do not have enabling statues/ordinances which require police officers/command staff cooperate as a condition of their employment. This allows lack of accountability on the hands of the police allows for obstruction of investigations and reviews by oversight agencies. 54% of oversight agencies reported that police officials did not implement their recommendations very frequently/frequently.

Only 6% of oversight agencies are able to impose discipline on the police departments and officers they oversee. This lack of authority allows for police departments to ignore important recommendations made by oversight agencies. It can sometimes appear that explicit cooperation is provided to civilian oversight agencies by police departments along with respect for the legitimacy of the oversight agency, while at the same time a subtle and persistent push back exists to minimize the impact of oversight agencies. The intention of this push back is to cause the citizens to lose faith in the oversight agency's effectiveness or to have elected officials question the investment in the oversight agency and ultimately cause them to lose their funding.

See also
 Community policing

References 

Police oversight organizations
Law enforcement in the United States